Choeromorpha lambii is a species of beetle in the family Cerambycidae. It was described by Pascoe in 1866. It is known from Malaysia and Sumatra.

Subspecies
 Choeromorpha lambii lambii (Pascoe, 1866)
 Choeromorpha lambii sumatrana Hüdepohl, 1998

References

Choeromorpha
Beetles described in 1866